Pritam Hazarika (born 28 September 1969) was an Indian cricketer. He was a right-handed batsman and a right-arm off-break bowler and wicket-keeper who played for Assam. Hazarika was born in Gauhati.

Hazarika made his first-class debut for the team against Tripura in February 1988, in Assam's final game in the 1987-88 Ranji Trophy. The team won the game by an innings margin, thanks to centuries and then-best innings totals by both Rajkumar Das and Rajesh Borah.

Hazarika made a single appearance in each of the following two seasons, failing to get out of single figures each time. He was a lower-middle order batsman.

External links
Pritam Hazarika at CricketArchive 

1969 births
Living people
Indian cricketers
Assam cricketers